Microbregma is a monotypic genus of beetles in the family Ptinidae containing the single species Microbregma emarginatum. It is native to North America.

The beetle lives in hardwood and softwood forests. The larva feeds on bark. It has been collected from pine, hemlock, hickory, and spruce.

References

Ptinidae
Bostrichoidea genera
Monotypic Bostrichiformia genera